This is a list of settlements in the Corfu regional unit''', Greece.

 Afionas
 Afra
 Agioi Deka
 Agioi Douloi
 Agios Athanasios
 Agios Ioannis
 Agios Markos
 Agios Matthaios
 Agios Nikolaos
 Agios Panteleimonas
 Agios Prokopios
 Agrafoi
 Agros
 Aleimmatades
 Alepou
 Ano Garouna
 Ano Korakiana
 Ano Lefkimmi
 Ano Pavliana
 Antipernoi
 Argyrades
 Arillas
 Arkadades
 Armenades
 Avliotes
 Benitses
 Chlomatiana
 Chlomos
 Chorepiskopoi
 Corfu (city)
 Dafni
 Doukades
 Drosato
 Episkepsi
 Ereikoussa
 Evropouloi
 Gaios 
 Gardelades
 Gastouri
 Giannades
 Gimari
 Kalafationes
 Kamara
 Kanakades
 Kanalia
 Karousades
 Kassiopi
 Kastelannoi
 Kastellanoi
 Kato Garouna
 Kato Korakiana
 Kato Pavliana
 Kavallouri
 Kavvadades
 Klimatia
 Kokkini
 Kompitsi
 Kouramades
 Kouspades
 Krini
 Kynopiastes
 Lafki
 Lakka
 Lakones
 Lefkimmi
 Liapades
 Longos
 Loutses
 Magazia
 Magoulades
 Makrades
 Marmaro
 Mathraki
 Mesaria
 Moraitika
 Neochori
 Nisaki
 Nymfes
 Othonoi
 Pagoi
 Pelekas
 Pentati
 Peritheia
 Perivoli
 Peroulades
 Petaleia
 Petriti
 Rachtades
 Sfakera
 Sgourades
 Sidari
 Sinarades
 Sini
 Skripero
 Sokraki
 Spartylas
 Stavros
 Strongyli
 Valaneio
 Varypatades
 Vasilatika
 Vatos
 Velonades
 Viros
 Vitalades
 Vouniatades
 Xanthates
 Zygos

By municipality

See also
List of towns and villages of Greece

Corfu